The Tune stone is an important runestone from about 200–450 AD. It bears runes of the Elder Futhark, and the language is Proto-Norse. It was discovered in 1627 in the church yard wall of the church in Tune, Østfold, Norway. Today it is housed in the Norwegian Museum of Cultural History in Oslo. The Tune stone is possibly the oldest Norwegian attestation of burial rites and inheritance.

Inscription
The stone has inscriptions on two sides, called side A and side B. Side A consists of an inscription of two lines (A1 and A2), and side B consists of an inscription of three lines (B1, B2 and B3), each line done in boustrophedon style.

The A side reads: 
A1: ekwiwazafter·woduri
A2: dewitadahalaiban:worathto·?[---

The B side reads: 
B1: ????zwoduride:staina:
B2: þrijozdohtrizdalidun
B3: arbijasijostezarbijano

The transcription of the runic text is:
A: Ek Wiwaz after Woduride witandahlaiban worhto r[unoz].
B: [Me]z(?) Woduride staina þrijoz dohtriz dalidun(?) arbija arjostez(?) arbijano.

The English translation is:
I, Wiwaz, made the runes after Woduridaz, my lord. For me, Woduridaz, three daughters, the most distinguished of the heirs, prepared the stone.

The name Wiwaz means 'the promised one', from Proto-Indo-European *h₁wegʷʰ-ós, while Woduridaz means 'fury-rider'. The phrase witandahlaiban, translated as 'my lord', literally means 'ward-bread' or 'guardian of the bread'. (The English word lord similarly originates from Old English hlāford < hlāf-weard, literally 'loaf-ward', i.e. 'guardian of the bread'.)

Interpretations
The runic inscription was first interpreted by Sophus Bugge in 1903 and Carl Marstrander in 1930, but the full text was not interpreted convincingly until 1981 by Ottar Grønvik in his book Runene på Tunesteinen.

See also
Åsetesrett
List of runestones

Notes

References

 
 Grønvik, Ottar (1981). Runene på Tunesteinen: Alfabet, Språkform, Budskap. Universitetsforlaget 
 
 

5th-century inscriptions
Runestones in Norway
Proto-Norse language